The 2010 Swale Borough Council election took place on 6 May 2010 to elect members of Swale Borough Council in Kent, England. One third of the council was up for election and the Conservative Party stayed in overall control of the council.

After the election, the composition of the council was:
Conservative 33
Labour 10
Liberal Democrats 3
Independent 1

Background
After the last election in 2008 the Conservatives had a majority on the council with 26 councillors, compared to 9 for Labour, 7 independents and 5 Liberal Democrats. However both the Conservative and Labour parties gained a seat at two by-elections in September 2008, after the independent councillors from Sheppey First resigned from the council.

By the time of the 2010 election there remained only one independent councillor, after Sheppey Central councillor Lesley Ingham joined the Conservatives in October 2009, before Pat Sandle and Paul Sturdgess also became Conservative councillors in March 2010. Meanwhile, the Liberal Democrat group on the council was reduced when St Michael's councillor Nick Williams defected to Labour in October 2009. This meant that before the 2010 election the Conservatives had 31 seats on the council, while Labour had 11, the Liberal Democrats had 4 and there was 1 independent.

Election result
The Conservatives made a net gain of two seats to win 14 of the 17 seats contested. The gains came at the expense of the Labour and Liberal Democrat parties, which each finished one seat down.

The Conservatives took Murston from the Liberal Democrats and Roman from Labour, as well as gaining Sheerness East by a single vote from Labour. However Labour retained Chalkwell with a majority of 30 votes over the Conservatives and gained one of the two seats contested in Queenborough and Halfway from the Conservatives.

Ward results

References

2010
2010 English local elections
May 2010 events in the United Kingdom
2010s in Kent